Exogenesis: Perils of Rebirth is a science fiction adventure game/visual novel developed by Kwan for Microsoft Windows, OS X, and Linux.

Gameplay
The game alternates between point-and-click adventure sections in first person, in which the player explores the environment and solves puzzles, and visual novel sections in which the game's plot is told and the player influences the outcome of dialogs with other characters. Kwan says they were inspired by Shu Takumi's game series Ace Attorney, and Kotaro Uchikoshi's Nine Hours, Nine Persons, Nine Doors and Zero Escape: Virtue's Last Reward.

Plot
The game begins during a treasure hunt in 2069 in a post-apocalyptic Japan, where the treasure hunter group Durchhalten accidentally activates a trap, resulting in one of the members, Miho Sayashi, getting impaled by spears and dying. The treasure hunt is canceled, and the group ends up splitting up.

Two years later, Miho's brother Yu and another former Durchhalten member, Toshio Taro, find out that Noah's Ark actually exists, and that it contains the Lazarus Protocol, a machine that is said to be able to recreate things from the past. Yu plans to reunite Durchhalten, and to use the Lazarus Protocol to bring Miho back to life.

Development
The game was successfully funded with a crowdfunding campaign on Kickstarter; its goal was $32,000, and by the end of the crowdfunding period, $56,288 had been pledged by backers.

Kwan released a demo during the Kickstarter campaign with a length of 3–4 hours, containing about 80% of the first chapter. The game is going to be fully voiced by TeamFourStar, including voice actors who have worked on Dust: An Elysian Tail, DreadOut, The Journey Down, and Heroes of Newerth. In May 2014, a German demo was released.

The game was originally set to be released in December 2014, but ended up getting delayed. It was initially developed with the visual novel engine Ren'Py, but was then ported to Unity in order to make PlayStation 3, PlayStation 4, PlayStation Vita, Wii U and iOS releases possible. A Nintendo 3DS port was planned, but would only be possible when Nintendo allows the use of Unity on the Nintendo 3DS.

References

External links
 Official website  
 

Adventure games
Android (operating system) games
Early access video games
Indie video games
IOS games
Kickstarter-funded video games
Crowdfunded video games
Linux games
MacOS games
Ren'Py games
Science fiction video games
Tokyo in fiction
Upcoming video games
Visual novels
Windows games